Ahmad bin Mohamed Ibrahim (15 May 1916 – 17 April 1999) was a Singaporean lawyer and law professor who served as the first Attorney-General of Singapore between 1965 and 1967.

Early life
Ahmad was educated in Victoria Bridge School (now Victoria School), Raffles Institution, and Raffles College (now the National University of Singapore). In 1936, he received the Queen's Scholarship (now known as the President's Scholarship) to study in St John's College, University of Cambridge. He graduated in 1939 with 1st Class Economics Tripos I and 1st Class Law Tripos II, then attained the Masters in Law in 1965. He was awarded the Honorary Degree of Doctor of Laws (LL.D) from the University of Singapore on 5 June 1965.

Career
In 1948, Ahmad stood as an independent candidate in the Municipal Commission Election in Singapore and won. He became Singapore's first State Advocate General in 1959, and the nation's first non-British Attorney-General in 1966. He moved to Malaysia in 1969. In 1972, he became the dean of the law faculty of the University of Malaya. There he established the first law faculty in Malaysia. He was also later made Professor of Malaysian Law, and in 1984 University of Malaya honoured Ahmad with the highest academic title it could confer - Professor Emeritus. In 1984, Ahmad was instrumental in setting up the Kulliyyah of Laws at International Islamic University Malaysia (IIUM), and was made the Shaikh and the Dean of the Kulliyyah. In 2000, the Kulliyyah was proclaimed as Ahmad Ibrahim Kulliyyah in honour of Ahmad as the founding father of the Kulliyyah.

Ahmad was a key person in the merger talks between Singapore and Malaysia in the early 1960s. He was also the legal expert in the Singapore delegation to the Malaysia Talks in London in 1963, which discussed independence from Britain.

Former Singaporean deputy prime minister Goh Keng Swee once described Ahmad as a man of "tremendous breadth and depth of intellect, whose ability as a legal draftsman is unsurpassed in this country".

Ahmad was also the brother of the actor Cal Bellini (real name Khalid Ibrahim).

Honour

Honour of Malaysia
  : Commander of the Order of Loyalty to the Crown of Malaysia (P.S.M.) (1987)

References 

https://web.archive.org/web/20080218160308/http://www.agc.gov.sg/aboutus/history.htm

1916 births
1999 deaths
Alumni of St John's College, Cambridge
Malayan people of World War II
Singaporean Muslims
Singaporean emigrants to Malaysia
Attorneys-General of Singapore
Singaporean people of Malay descent
Queen's Scholars (British Malaya and Singapore)
Victoria School, Singapore alumni
Raffles Institution alumni
20th-century Singaporean lawyers
Commanders of the Order of Loyalty to the Crown of Malaysia